Larocheopsis is a genus of small to minute sea snails, marine gastropod mollusks or micromollusks in the family Larocheidae.

Species
Species within the genus Larocheopsis include:
 Larocheopsis amplexa Marshall, 1993
 Larocheopsis macrostoma Geiger & B.A. Marshall, 2012
 † Larocheopsis microclathrata (Gougerot & Le Renard, 1977) 
Species brought into synonymy † Larocheopsis marshalli Lozouet, 1998: synonym of † Trogloconcha marshalli'' (Lozouet, 1998)  (original combination)

References

  Marshall, B. A. (1993). The systematic position of Larochea Finlay, 1927, and introduction of a new genus and two new species (Gastropoda: Scissurellidae). Journal of Molluscan Studies 59: 285-294.
 Geiger, D.L. (2012). Monograph of the little slit shells. Volume 1. Introduction, Scissurellidae. pp. 1-728. Volume 2. Anatomidae, Larocheidae, Depressizonidae, Sutilizonidae, Temnocinclidae. pp. 729-1291. Santa Barbara Museum of Natural History Monographs. Number 7.

External links
 To World Register of Marine Species

Larocheidae